James Taylor (born 9 January 1809) was an English professional cricketer who played first-class cricket from 1834 to 1844.  He was mainly associated with Sussex and made 28 known appearances in first-class matches including 1 for the Players in 1837.

References

1809 births
Date of death unknown
English cricketers
English cricketers of 1826 to 1863
Sussex cricketers
Year of death missing
Petworth cricketers
North v South cricketers
Players cricketers
Left-Handed v Right-Handed cricketers